Simon Bairu (born 8 August 1983) is a Canadian long-distance runner.

Early life
Bairu was born in Riyadh, Saudi Arabia, to an Ethiopian mother and an Eritrean father. He grew up in Regina, Saskatchewan, Canada where his family moved to when he was three years old.

Career
Bairu attended Dr. Martin LeBoldus High School, where he flourished as a provincial and then national level track and field athlete. He then attended the University of Wisconsin where he was guided by coach Jerry Schumacher to win two NCAA cross-country titles.

As a post-collegiate, Bairu moved to Portland, Oregon to train with the Bowerman Track Club, a professional athletics group founded by Schumacher that was originally formed primarily by Wisconsin teammates, such as Chris Solinsky, Matt Tegenkamp, Evan Jager and Tim Nelson.

In 2010, Bairu placed 12th at the 2010 IAAF World Cross Country Championships, as well as set a 10,000 m Canadian national record of 27:23.63 minutes at Stanford (this record was bettered by Cameron Levins in 2013). Over his career, Bairu won a record seven Canadian Cross Country Championship titles. Additionally, he also won the inaugural Miami Beach Half Marathon in December 2011, as well as the San Jose Half Marathon in October 2012.

Bairu officially retired from professional racing in September 2014.

Personal bests 

 All information taken from IAAF profile.

See also
 Canadian records in track and field

References

External links  	
 Official Website
 
 Profile at Athletics Canada

Living people
1983 births
Canadian male long-distance runners
University of Wisconsin–Madison alumni
Athletes from Regina, Saskatchewan
Sportspeople from Riyadh
Canadian people of Ethiopian descent
Canadian people of Eritrean descent
Wisconsin Badgers men's track and field athletes
Saudi Arabian emigrants to Canada
Wisconsin Badgers men's cross country runners